Cyrus Edgar Dietz (March 17, 1876 – September 13, 1929) was a justice of the Illinois Supreme Court and a college football player and coach.

Dietz graduated in 1897 from the Grand Prairie Seminary in Onarga, Illinois. Dietz then attended Northwestern University, which was affiliated with the seminary. At Northwestern, Dietz played guard for four seasons for the football team, serving as captain of the team for the 1900 and 1901 seasons. Also starting on the team during three of these years was Dietz's brother, G. O. Dietz. Cyrus Dietz graduated from Northwestern in 1902 with a law degree, and was a member of the Delta Chi fraternity along with his brother.

Dietz became the seventh head football coach for the Kansas State Wildcats in 1902, holding that position for one season. Dietz also played with the team in its first game of the year in 1902.  His record at Kansas State was 2–6. Dietz's brother coached the team the following year.

Dietz and his brother subsequently went into the practice of law together, opening a law firm in Moline, Illinois, with Burton Peek. In 1928, Dietz was selected special counsel to represent the State of Illinois in the Wisconsin v. Illinois case in the U.S. Supreme Court.

Dietz was elected to the Illinois Supreme Court on November 6, 1928. He died in office the following year in Moline, after suffering injuries in a fall from a horse. His brother, Godlove O. Dietz died in March of the same year.

Head coaching record

References

External links
 

1929 deaths
1876 births
19th-century players of American football
American football guards
Kansas State Wildcats football coaches
Kansas State Wildcats football players
Northwestern Wildcats football players
Northwestern University Pritzker School of Law alumni
Justices of the Illinois Supreme Court